Museum of African-American History may refer to:
DuSable Museum of African American History, a museum in Chicago, Illinois
Reginald F. Lewis Museum of Maryland African American History & Culture, a museum in Baltimore, Maryland
Museum of African American History (Boston, Massachusetts), a museum in Boston, Massachusetts
National Museum of African American History and Culture, a museum in Washington, D.C.
Charles H. Wright Museum of African American History, a museum in Detroit, Michigan
Legacy Museum of African American History, a museum in Lynchburg, Virginia

See also
 List of museums focused on African Americans